The Oklahoma Baptist Bison are the athletic teams that represent Oklahoma Baptist University, located in Shawnee, Oklahoma, in intercollegiate athletics as a member of the NCAA Division II ranks, primarily competing in the Great American Conference (GAC) since the 2015–16 academic year. They were also a member of the National Christian College Athletic Association (NCCAA), primarily competing as an independent in the Central Region of the Division I level.

Prior joining the NCAA, the Bison previously competed in the National Association of Intercollegiate Athletics (NAIA), primarily competing in the Sooner Athletic Conference (SAC) from 1978–79 to 2014–15; and in the Texoma Athletic Conference from 1973–74 to 1977–78.

Move to NCAA Division II
As of July 11, 2014, the NCAA Division II Membership Committee recommended the membership application for the institution to set up the move from the NAIA to NCAA Division II, competing in the Great American Conference, effectively the 2015–16 season.

Varsity teams 
OBU competes in 13 intercollegiate varsity sports: Men's sports include baseball, basketball, cross country, football and track and field; while women's sports include basketball, cross country, golf, soccer, softball, stunt, track & field and volleyball. Former sports included men's golf, women's lacrosse, men's soccer, men's & women's swimming, men's & women's tennis and women's cheerleading.

Baseball
Oklahoma Baptist has had 15 Major League Baseball Draft selections since the draft began in 1965.

Swimming
OBU has won NAIA championships in men's swimming and diving (2012 and 2013) and women's swimming and diving (2013).

On March 9, 2012, swim team member Ivan Maciuniak, age 22, drowned in the pool. A native of Las Palmas, Canary Islands, Spain, Maciuniak had joined his brother, Mateo, at OBU in January 2012. The Maciuniak brothers were on the four-man 400-meter relay team which won the final event of the meet to claim the national championship in OBU's first year of intercollegiate swimming.

References

External links